"Lawyers, Guns and Money" is a song by Warren Zevon, and the closing track on his 1978 album Excitable Boy. 

Record World called it "rock 'n' roll at its angriest."

Versions
An edited version of the song was released as a single and this edited version is on the A Quiet Normal Life best of compilation on the physical CD and LP, although the lyrics on the rear cover are the full un-edited version. The digital download and streaming version of the compilation use the album version.

Covers 
The song was first covered by Rick Derringer on the 1978 album If I Weren't So Romantic, I'd Shoot You and was released as a single. Meat Loaf covered the song on his 1999 live album VH1 Storytellers. It was later covered by The Wallflowers on the album Enjoy Every Sandwich: The Songs of Warren Zevon in 2004. It was also a hit for Hank Williams Jr. in 1983 (from his album Five-O, and as a B-side of his single "I'm for Love") and is regularly played live by Widespread Panic.  It has also been covered by Micky & The Motorcars, with a recording of it on their "Live at Billy Bob's Texas" album.

Uses in popular culture 
The song lent its title to a light-hearted radio program on the Melbourne community radio station, 3RRR, which looked at the legal fraternity in the city. The program started in 1985 and ran for several years hosted by the pseudonymous duo "Donoghue & Stevenson"—Dennis Connell and Ross Stevenson. The song was used as both intro and exit music for the program.

The song was used for the opening of the show Justice, with Victor Garber, in 2006.
There is a blog called Lawyers Guns and Money. The third episode of HBO's 2022 series, The Staircase, featured the song for its end credits. The song was also used in the third episode of Season 10 of "Strapped" - a YouTube series created by No Laying Up - when Neil "The Kid" Schuster and Phil "Big Randy" Landis broke bad, blew through the budget, and told the C-Suite to shove it, respectfully.

References

Warren Zevon songs
1978 songs
Songs written by Warren Zevon
Hank Williams Jr. songs
American hard rock songs